Liriodendron chinense (commonly known as the Chinese tulip poplar, Chinese tulip tree or Chinese whitewood) is Asia's native species in the genus Liriodendron. This native of central and southern China grows in the provinces of Anhui, Guangxi, Jiangsu, Fujian, Guizhou, Hubei, Hunan, Jiangxi, Shaanxi, Zhejiang, Sichuan and Yunnan, and also locally in northern Vietnam. Protected populations occur in the Tianmushan National Reserve, Huangshan, Wuyi Shan, and Badagongshan Nature Reserve.

Description
Liriodendron chinense is very similar to the American species, Liriodendron tulipifera, differing in the often slightly larger and more deeply lobed leaves, and in the shorter inner petals in the flowers, which lack the orange pigment of L. tulipifera. Most of its populations are deciduous, with a semi-evergreen population identified at Mengla, Yunnan.

Cultivation
It is not as hardy as the American species, but is cultivated on other continents as an ornamental tree. It is grown in England (where there are many at Kew Gardens), Ireland, Belgium, the Netherlands, and Germany. In North America, it grows as far north as Boston, Massachusetts, in the east, and Vancouver, British Columbia, in the west.  It is a street tree at the University of Victoria and along the Veterans' Memorial Parkway in Langford, British Columbia. A plantation of it is at the National Arboretum in Canberra. In cultivation it grows as fast as the American tulip tree. A cultivar (J.C.Raulston) with leaves larger and darker than typical has been developed in North Carolina.

In the United Kingdom L. chinense has gained the Royal Horticultural Society’s Award of Garden Merit.

References

 Hunt, D. (ed). 1998. Magnolias and their allies. International Dendrology Society & Magnolia Society.

External links
 www.Asianflora: Liriodendron chinense

Magnoliaceae
Trees of China
Trees of Vietnam
Near threatened flora of Asia
Garden plants of Asia
Ornamental trees